Lago Argentino Airport , was an airport in Lago Argentino, Argentina.

Former Airlines and destinations

See also

Transport in Argentina
List of airports in Argentina

References

External links
OpenStreetMap - Lago Argentino closed

Defunct airports
Airports in Argentina
Airports disestablished in 2006